Bridouxia rotundata is a species of tropical freshwater snail with a gill and an operculum, an aquatic gastropod mollusk in the family Paludomidae.

This species is found in Burundi, the Democratic Republic of the Congo, Tanzania, and Zambia. Its natural habitat is freshwater lakes.

References

Paludomidae
Gastropods described in 1904
Taxonomy articles created by Polbot